Nosocomiicoccus is a genus of gram-positive cocci. The name is derived nosocomium -  hospital; coccus from Greek noun kokkos - a coccus a grain, berry: Nosocomiicoccus - a coccus isolated in a hospital. The genus was erected in 2008. The genus is a member of the family Staphylococcaceae. A common feature of all members of this family is their osmo- and halotolerance - the ability to grow at high salt concentrations.

Description
The type species of the genus is Nosocomiicoccus ampullae.

Genome
A draft full genome sequence of Nosocomiicoccus massiliensis is available in Genbank (accession CAVG000000000). The bacterial chromosome has an estimated size of about 1.650.00 nt, and a GC-content of 36.5%. About 1700 proteins are encoded on the chromosome, and about 1000 proteins have close orthologs in the sibling genera Macrococcus, Salinicoccus and Staphylococcus.

Clinical importance
None of the species in this genus is known to be pathogenic to humans.

References

Staphylococcaceae
Monotypic bacteria genera
Bacteria genera